Albert Meyer (13 March 1870 – 22 October 1953) was a Swiss politician, editor of Neue Zürcher Zeitung (1915-1930) and member of the Swiss Federal Council (1929–1938).

He was elected to the Swiss Federal Council on 12 December 1929 and handed over office on 31 December 1938. He was affiliated to the Free Democratic Party. 

During his time in office he held the Department of Home Affairs from 1930 to 1934 and the Department of Finance from 1934 to 1938, and was President of the Confederation in 1936.

References

External links

 

1870 births
1953 deaths
People from Uster District
Swiss Calvinist and Reformed Christians
Free Democratic Party of Switzerland politicians
Members of the Federal Council (Switzerland)
Finance ministers of Switzerland
Members of the National Council (Switzerland)
Swiss military officers
University of Zurich alumni
Humboldt University of Berlin alumni
Leipzig University alumni
19th-century Swiss military personnel